In typesetting, the hook above is a diacritic mark placed on top of vowels in the Vietnamese alphabet. In shape it looks like a tiny question mark without the dot underneath, or a tiny glottal stop (ʔ). For example, a capital A with a hook is "Ả", and a lower case "u" with a hook is "ủ". The hook is usually written to the right of the circumflex in conventional Vietnamese orthography. If Vietnamese characters are unavailable, it is often replaced by a question mark after the vowel (VIQR encoding).

This diacritic functions as a tone marker, indicating a "mid falling" tone: which is "dipping" (˨˩˥) in Southern Vietnamese or "falling" (˧˩) in Northern Vietnamese; see Vietnamese language § Regional variation: Tones. The Southern "dipping" tone is similar to the questioning intonation in English.

The hook above can be used as a tone marker, but is not regarded as part of the alphabet.

Letters with hook above

Unicode
Apart from precomposed characters, in multiple scripts, the combining diacritical mark is encoded at

See also
 Horn (diacritic)
 Hook (diacritic)

External links
 More information for typographers

Latin-script diacritics
Vietnamese language
Vietnamese alphabets